This page describes the production history of the Stratford Festival.

The Stratford Festival (formerly known as the Stratford Shakespearean Festival, the Stratford Festival of Canada, and the Stratford Shakespeare Festival) is a summer-long celebration of theatre held each year in Stratford, Ontario. Theatre-goers, actors, and playwrights flock to Stratford to take part—many of the greatest Canadian, American and British actors have played roles at Stratford. It was one of the first and is still one of the most prominent arts festivals in Canada.

The Festival's primary mandate is to present productions of Shakespeare's plays, but it also produces a wide variety of theatre from Greek tragedy to Broadway musicals to contemporary works. By 2017, only three of the 14 productions were based on Shakespeare's works. The following is a chronological list of the productions that have been staged as part of the Stratford Festival since its inception.

On February 17, 2015, AP News reported that the Stratford Festival plans to film all of Shakespeare's plays.

1953
Richard III – by William Shakespeare
All's Well That Ends Well – by William Shakespeare

1954
Measure for Measure – by William Shakespeare
The Taming of the Shrew – by William Shakespeare
Oedipus Rex – by Sophocles

1955
Julius Caesar – by William Shakespeare
King Oedipus – by Sophocles
The Merchant of Venice – by William Shakespeare

1956
Henry V – by William Shakespeare
The Merry Wives of Windsor – by William Shakespeare
Le Mariage forcé / Sganarelle / La Jalousie du barbouillé – by Molière
The Rape of Lucrece – by William Shakespeare

1957
Hamlet – by William Shakespeare
Twelfth Night – by William Shakespeare
My Fur Lady – by Galt MacDermot
The Turn of the Screw – composed by Benjamin Britten, libretto by Myfanwy Piper
Peer Gynt – by Henrik Ibsen

1958
The Two Gentlemen of Verona – by William Shakespeare
Henry IV, Part 1 – by William Shakespeare
Much Ado About Nothing – by William Shakespeare
The Winter's Tale – by William Shakespeare
The Beggar's Opera – by John Gay
Le Malade Imaginaire – by Molière

1959
As You Like It – by William Shakespeare
Othello – by William Shakespeare
Orpheus in the Underworld – by Jacques Offenbach
After Hours
The Heart Is Highland – by Robert Kemp

1960
King John – by William Shakespeare
A Midsummer Night's Dream – by William Shakespeare
Romeo and Juliet – by William Shakespeare
H.M.S. Pinafore – music by Arthur Sullivan, libretto by W. S. Gilbert

1961
Coriolanus – by William Shakespeare
Henry VIII – by William Shakespeare
Love's Labour's Lost – by William Shakespeare
The Pirates of Penzance – music by Arthur Sullivan, libretto by W. S. Gilbert
The Canvas Barricade – by Donald Jack

1962
The Pirates of Penzance – music by Arthur Sullivan, libretto by W. S. Gilbert
Macbeth – by William Shakespeare
The Taming of the Shrew – by William Shakespeare
The Tempest – by William Shakespeare
The Gondoliers – music by Arthur Sullivan, libretto by W. S. Gilbert
Cyrano de Bergerac – by Edmond Rostand

1963
Troilus and Cressida – by William Shakespeare
Cyrano de Bergerac – by Edmond Rostand
The Comedy of Errors – by William Shakespeare
The Mikado – music by Arthur Sullivan, libretto by W. S. Gilbert
Timon of Athens – by William Shakespeare

1964
Love's Labour's Lost – by William Shakespeare
Le Bourgeois gentilhomme – by Molière
Timon of Athens – by William Shakespeare
Richard II – by William Shakespeare
King Lear – by William Shakespeare
The Yeomen of the Guard – music by Arthur Sullivan, libretto by W. S. Gilbert
The Country Wife – by William Wycherley
The Marriage of Figaro – by Wolfgang Amadeus Mozart

1965
Henry IV, Part 1 – by William Shakespeare
Henry IV, Part 2 – by William Shakespeare
Julius Caesar – by William Shakespeare
Rise and Fall of the City of Mahagonny – by Kurt Weill, libretto by Bertolt Brecht
The Marriage of Figaro – by Wolfgang Amadeus Mozart
The Cherry Orchard – by Anton Chekhov

1966
Henry V – by William Shakespeare
Henry VI – by William Shakespeare
Twelfth Night – by William Shakespeare
Don Giovanni – by Wolfgang Amadeus Mozart
The Last of the Tsars – by Michael Bawtree
The Dance of Death – by August Strindberg

1967
Henry V – by William Shakespeare
The Government Inspector – by Nikolai Gogol
Twelfth Night – by William Shakespeare
Richard III – by William Shakespeare
The Merry Wives of Windsor – by William Shakespeare
Così fan tutte – by Wolfgang Amadeus Mozart
Albert Herring – by Benjamin Britten
Colours in the Dark – by James Reaney
Antony and Cleopatra – by William Shakespeare

1968
A Midsummer Night's Dream – by William Shakespeare
Romeo and Juliet – by William Shakespeare
Tartuffe – by Molière
Cinderella – by Gioacchino Rossini
The Three Musketeers – by Alexandre Dumas
The Seagull – by Anton Chekhov
Waiting for Godot – by Samuel Beckett

1969
The Alchemist – by Ben Jonson
Hamlet – by William Shakespeare
Measure for Measure – by William Shakespeare
Tartuffe – by Molière
The Satyricon – by Petronius Arbiter
Hadrian VII – by Frederick Rolfe

1970
The School for Scandal – by Richard Brinsley Sheridan
The Merchant of Venice – by William Shakespeare
Hedda Gabler – by Henrik Ibsen
The Architect and the Emperor of Assyria – by Fernando Arrabal
Cymbeline – by William Shakespeare
The Friends – by Arnold Wesker
Vatzlav – by Slawomir Mrozek

1971
Much Ado About Nothing – by William Shakespeare
The Duchess of Malfi – by John Webster
Macbeth – by William Shakespeare
An Italian Straw Hat – by Eugène Labiche
The Red Convertible – by Enrique Buenaventura
Volpone – by Ben Jonson
There's One In Every Marriage – by Georges Feydeau

1972
As You Like It – by William Shakespeare
Lorenzaccio – by Alfred de Musset
King Lear – by William Shakespeare
The Threepenny Opera – by Bertolt Brecht and Kurt Weill
Orpheus
Mark
She Stoops to Conquer – by Oliver Goldsmith
Pinocchio – by John Wood and Alan Laing
La Guerre Yes Sir! – by Roch Carrier

1973
The Taming of the Shrew – by William Shakespeare
King Lear – by William Shakespeare
She Stoops to Conquer – by Oliver Goldsmith
Othello – by William Shakespeare
A Month in the Country – by Ivan Turgenev
The Collected Works of Billy the Kid – by Michael Ondaatje
Pericles – by William Shakespeare
Inook and the Sun – by Henry Beissel
The Marriage Brokers – by Nikolai Gogol
Exiles – by James Joyce

1974
The Imaginary Invalid – by Molière
Pericles – by William Shakespeare
Love's Labour's Lost – by William Shakespeare
La Vie Parisienne – composed by Jacques Offenbach, libretto by Henri Meilhac and Ludovic Halévy
The Summoning of Everyman – by Charles Wilson
The Medium – by Gian Carlo Menotti
King John – by William Shakespeare
Walsh – by Sharon Pollock
Ready Steady Go – by Sandra Jones

1975
The Two Gentlemen of Verona – by William Shakespeare
The Comedy of Errors – by William Shakespeare
Saint Joan – by George Bernard Shaw
Twelfth Night – by William Shakespeare
Measure for Measure – by William Shakespeare
The Crucible – by Arthur Miller
Trumpets and Drums – by Bertolt Brecht
The Fool – by Harry Somers and Michael Fram
Le Magicien – by Jean Vallerand
Ariadne Auf Naxos – by Richard Strauss
Fellowship – by Michael Tait
Oscar Remembered – by Maxim Mazumdar
Kennedy's Children
The Importance of Being Earnest – by Oscar Wilde

1976
Hamlet – by William Shakespeare
The Way of the World – by William Congreve
The Merchant of Venice – by William Shakespeare
The Tempest – by William Shakespeare
Antony and Cleopatra – by William Shakespeare
The Importance of Being Earnest – by Oscar Wilde
Measure for Measure – by William Shakespeare
Eve – by Larry Fineberg
A Midsummer Night's Dream – by William Shakespeare
Three Sisters – by Anton Chekhov

1977
A Midsummer Night's Dream – by William Shakespeare
Romeo and Juliet – by William Shakespeare
All's Well That Ends Well – by William Shakespeare
Ghosts – by Henrik Ibsen
Miss Julie – by August Strindberg
Richard III – by William Shakespeare
The Guardsman – by Ferenc Molnár
Much Ado About Nothing – by William Shakespeare
As You Like It – by William Shakespeare
Hay Fever – by Noël Coward

1978
A Gala Shakespeare Revel
The Devils – by John Whiting
The Merry Wives of Windsor – by William Shakespeare
Macbeth – by William Shakespeare
Uncle Vanya – by Anton Chekhov
Candide – music by Leonard Bernstein –  book by Hugh Wheeler
The Winter's Tale – by William Shakespeare
As You Like It – by William Shakespeare
Judgement – by Barry Collins
Heloise and Abelard: Love Letters from the Middle Ages – by Ronald Duncan
Ned and Jack – by Sheldon Rosen
Medea – by Larry Fineberg
Private Lives – by Noël Coward
Julius Caesar – by William Shakespeare
Come and Go, Not I, From an Abandoned Work, Footfalls – by Samuel Beckett
Stargazing – by Tom Cone
Titus Andronicus – by William Shakespeare

1979
Shakespeare Gala
Love's Labour's Lost – by William Shakespeare
Ned and Jack – by Sheldon Rosen
Henry IV, Part 1 – by William Shakespeare
Henry IV, Part 2 – by William Shakespeare
Richard II – by William Shakespeare
The Importance of Being Earnest – by Oscar Wilde
Happy New Year – book by Burt Shevelove, music and lyrics by Cole Porter
The Taming of the Shrew – by William Shakespeare
The Woman – by Edward Bond
Othello – by William Shakespeare
Victoria – by Steve Petch
Barren/Yerma – by Federico García Lorca
King Lear – by William Shakespeare

1980
The Beggar's Opera – by John Gay
Twelfth Night – by William Shakespeare
Henry V – by William Shakespeare
Virginia – by Edna O'Brien
The Servant of Two Masters – by Carlo Goldoni
Titus Andronicus – by William Shakespeare
The Gin Game – by Donald L. Coburn
Much Ado About Nothing – by William Shakespeare
Bosoms and Neglect – by John Guare
Brief Lives – by Patrick Garland, based on the writings of John Aubrey
Foxfire – by Susan Cooper and Hume Cronyn
The Seagull – by Anton Chekhov
Henry VI – by William Shakespeare
King Lear – by William Shakespeare
Long Day's Journey into Night – by Eugene O'Neill

1981
The Misanthrope – by Molière
H.M.S. Pinafore – music by Arthur Sullivan, libretto by W. S. Gilbert
Coriolanus – by William Shakespeare
The Taming of the Shrew – by William Shakespeare
The Rivals – by Richard Brinsley Sheridan
The Comedy of Errors – by William Shakespeare
The Visit – by Friedrich Dürrenmatt
Wild Oats – by John O'Keeffe

1982
Julius Caesar – by William Shakespeare
The Mikado – music by Arthur Sullivan, libretto by W. S. Gilbert
The Merry Wives of Windsor – by William Shakespeare
The Tempest – by William Shakespeare
A Midsummer Night's Dream – by William Shakespeare
All's Well That Ends Well – by William Shakespeare
Translations – by Brian Friel
Damien – by Aldyth Morris
Arms and the Man – by George Bernard Shaw
Mary Stuart – by Friedrich Schiller
A Variable Passion – by Nicholas Pennell and Elliott Hayes
Blithe Spirit – by Noël Coward

1983
Macbeth – by William Shakespeare
The Gondoliers – music by Arthur Sullivan, libretto by W. S. Gilbert
As You Like It – by William Shakespeare
Richard II – by William Shakespeare
Blake – by Elliott Hayes
Damien
The Mikado – music by Arthur Sullivan, libretto by W. S. Gilbert
When That I Was
The Country Wife – by William Wycherley
Tartuffe – by Molière
Love's Labour's Lost – by William Shakespeare
Much Ado About Nothing – by William Shakespeare
Death of a Salesman – by Arthur Miller

1984
A Midsummer Night's Dream – by William Shakespeare
Iolanthe – music by Arthur Sullivan, libretto by W. S. Gilbert
Romeo and Juliet – by William Shakespeare
Love's Labour's Lost – by William Shakespeare
The Gondoliers – music by Arthur Sullivan, libretto by W. S. Gilbert
Waiting for Godot – by Samuel Beckett
The Two Gentlemen of Verona – by William Shakespeare
The Mikado – music by Arthur Sullivan, libretto by W. S. Gilbert
Tartuffe – by Molière
Henry IV, Part 1 – by William Shakespeare
The Merchant of Venice – by William Shakespeare
A Streetcar Named Desire – by Tennessee Williams
Separate Tables – by Terence Rattigan

1985
King Lear – by William Shakespeare
The Pirates of Penzance – music by Arthur Sullivan, libretto by W. S. Gilbert
Twelfth Night – by William Shakespeare
Measure for Measure – by William Shakespeare
Antigone – by Sophocles
The Beaux' Stratagem – by George Farquhar
She Stoops to Conquer – by Oliver Goldsmith
The Government Inspector – by Nikolai Gogol
The Glass Menagerie – by Tennessee Williams

1986
The 1986 season was staged by Artistic Director John Neville with Shakespeare plays produced against a modern play with similar themes or characters (i.e. Hamlet and Rosencrantz and Guildenstern are Dead).

The Boys from Syracuse – by Richard Rodgers, lyrics by Lorenz Hart
Hamlet – by William Shakespeare
The Winter's Tale – by William Shakespeare
Rosencrantz & Guildenstern Are Dead – by Tom Stoppard
Pericles – by William Shakespeare
Henry VIII – by William Shakespeare
The Resistible Rise of Arturo Ui – by Bertolt Brecht
Macbeth – by William Shakespeare
A Man for All Seasons – by Robert Bolt
Cymbeline – by William Shakespeare

1987
Artistic Director John Neville staged the 1987 season with an Anti-War theme.

Cabaret – book by Joe Masteroff, lyrics by Fred Ebb, music by John Kander
Nora –  by Henrik Ibsen
Mother Courage – by Bertolt Brecht
As You Like It – by William Shakespeare
Troilus and Cressida – by William Shakespeare
The School for Scandal – by Richard Brinsley Sheridan
The Cherry Orchard – by Anton Chekhov
Romeo and Juliet – by William Shakespeare
Not About Heroes – by Stephen MacDonald
Intimate Admiration – by Richard Epp
Journey's End – by R. C. Sherriff
Othello – by William Shakespeare
Much Ado About Nothing – by William Shakespeare

1988
Richard III – by William Shakespeare
All's Well That Ends Well – by William Shakespeare
The Taming of the Shrew – by William Shakespeare
Murder in the Cathedral – by T. S. Eliot
Twelfth Night – by William Shakespeare
My Fair Lady – book and lyrics by Alan Jay Lerner, music by Frederick Loewe
King Lear – by William Shakespeare
The Two Gentlemen of Verona – by William Shakespeare
Not About Heroes – by Stephen MacDonald
The Three Musketeers – by Alexandre Dumas
Irma La Douce – music by Marguerite Monnot, lyrics and book by Alexandre Breffort
Oedipus / The Critic – by Sophocles / Richard Brinsley Sheridan

1989
Titus Andronicus / The Comedy of Errors – by William Shakespeare
A Midsummer Night's Dream – by William Shakespeare
The Merchant of Venice – by William Shakespeare
Three Sisters – by Anton Chekhov
Kiss Me, Kate – book by Samuel and Bella Spewack –  music and lyrics by Cole Porter
Henry V – by William Shakespeare
Love's Labour's Lost – by William Shakespeare
The Changeling – by Thomas Middleton and William Rowley
The Shoemaker's Holiday – by Thomas Dekker
The Relapse – by Sir John Vanbrugh
The Proposal – by Anton Chekhov
Cat on a Hot Tin Roof – by Tennessee Williams
Guthrie on Guthrie – by Margaret Dale
The Lunatic, the Lover & the Poet – adapted by Brian Bedford

1990
Macbeth – by William Shakespeare
The Merry Wives of Windsor – by William Shakespeare
As You Like It – by William Shakespeare
Home – by David Storey
Guys and Dolls – music and lyrics by Frank Loesser, book by Jo Swerling and Abe Burrows
Love for Love – by William Congreve
Memoir - by John Murrell
Forever Yours, Marie-Lou – by Michel Tremblay
Phaedra – by Jean Racine
Julius Caesar – by William Shakespeare
Ah, Wilderness! – by Eugene O'Neill
The Knight of the Burning Pestle – by Francis Beaumont
The Lunatic, the Lover & the Poet – adapted by Brian Bedford
The Grand Inquisitor / Swan Song – by Fyodor Dostoevsky / Anton Chekhov
One Tiger to a Hill – by Sharon Pollock

1991
Hamlet – by William Shakespeare
Carousel – by Richard Rodgers and Oscar Hammerstein II
Much Ado About Nothing – by William Shakespeare
Twelfth Night – by William Shakespeare
Homeward Bound – by Elliott Hayes
Les Belles Soeurs – by Michel Tremblay
Our Town – by Thornton Wilder
Timon of Athens – by William Shakespeare
Homeward Bound – by Elliott Hayes
The Knight of the Burning Pestle – by Francis Beaumont
Rules of the Game – by [Luigi Pirandello]
Treasure Island – by Robert Louis Stevenson
Love Letters – by A. R. Gurney

1992
The Tempest – by William Shakespeare
Romeo and Juliet – by William Shakespeare
Love's Labour's Lost – by William Shakespeare
Measure for Measure – by William Shakespeare
The Two Gentlemen of Verona – by William Shakespeare
H.M.S. Pinafore – music by Arthur Sullivan, libretto by W. S. Gilbert
World of Wonders – by Robertson Davies – adapted by Elliott Hayes
Entertaining Mr. Sloane – by Joe Orton
Uncle Vanya – by Anton Chekhov
Bonjour, là, bonjour – by Michel Tremblay
Shirley Valentine – by Willy Russell

1993
Antony and Cleopatra – by William Shakespeare
A Midsummer Night's Dream – by William Shakespeare
Gypsy – music by Jule Styne, lyrics by Stephen Sondheim, book by Arthur Laurents
The Imaginary Invalid – by Molière
The Mikado – music by Arthur Sullivan, libretto by W. S. Gilbert
The Importance of Being Earnest – by Oscar Wilde
King John – by William Shakespeare
The Wingfield Trilogy – by Dan Needles
Bacchae – by Euripides
Fair Liberty's Call – by Sharon Pollock
The Illusion – by Pierre Corneille

1994
Twelfth Night – by William Shakespeare
Othello – by William Shakespeare
Hamlet – by William Shakespeare
The Comedy of Errors – by William Shakespeare
Cyrano de Bergerac – by Edmond Rostand
The School for Wives – by Molière
Long Day's Journey into Night – by Eugene O'Neill; this version was later filmed by David Wellington as the 1996 film Long Day's Journey into Night.
The Pirates of Penzance – music by Arthur Sullivan, libretto by W. S. Gilbert
Alice Through the Looking-Glass – by Lewis Carroll
In the Ring – by Jean-Marc Dalpé

1995
Macbeth – by William Shakespeare
The Country Wife – by William Wycherley
The Merry Wives of Windsor – by William Shakespeare
Amadeus – by Peter Shaffer
The Gondoliers – music by Arthur Sullivan, libretto by W. S. Gilbert
The Boy Friend – by Sandy Wilson
Long Day's Journey into Night – by Eugene O'Neill
The Comedy of Errors – by William Shakespeare
The Stillborn Lover – by Timothy Findley

1996
King Lear – by William Shakespeare
The Music Man – by Meredith Willson
Amadeus – by Peter Shaffer
The Little Foxes – by Lillian Hellman
A Fitting Confusion – by Georges Feydeau
The Merchant of Venice – by William Shakespeare
Alice Through the Looking-Glass – by Lewis Carroll
As You Like It – by William Shakespeare
Sweet Bird of Youth – by Tennessee Williams
Waiting for Godot – by Samuel Beckett
Barrymore - by William Luce

1997
Camelot – by Alan Jay Lerner and Frederick Loewe
The Taming of the Shrew – by William Shakespeare
Romeo and Juliet – by William Shakespeare
Oedipus Rex – by Sophocles
Death of a Salesman – by Arthur Miller
Little Women – by Louisa May Alcott
Filumena – by Eduardo De Filippo
Richard III – by William Shakespeare
Juno and the Paycock – by Seán O'Casey
Coriolanus – by William Shakespeare
Wingfield Unbound – by Dan Needles
Equus – by Peter Shaffer

1998
Julius Caesar – by William Shakespeare
Man of La Mancha – book by Dale Wasserman, lyrics by Joe Darion, music by Mitch Leigh
A Man for All Seasons – by Robert Bolt
The Night of the Iguana – by Tennessee Williams
The Prime of Miss Jean Brodie – by Jay Presson Allen
The Winter's Tale – by William Shakespeare
The Two Gentlemen of Verona – by William Shakespeare
Much Ado About Nothing – by William Shakespeare
The Miracle Worker – by William Gibson
The Miser – by Molière
The Cherry Orchard – by Anton Chekhov, translation by John Murrell
Waiting for Godot – by Samuel Beckett

1999
The Tempest – by William Shakespeare
A Midsummer Night's Dream – by William Shakespeare
Pride and Prejudice – by Jane Austen
The Alchemist – by Ben Jonson
The School for Scandal – by Richard Brinsley Sheridan
Dracula: A Chamber Musical – book and lyrics by Richard Ouzounian, music by Marek Norman
West Side Story – book by Arthur Laurents, music by Leonard Bernstein, lyrics by Stephen Sondheim
Macbeth – by William Shakespeare
Glenn – by David Young
Richard II – by William Shakespeare

2000
Hamlet – by William Shakespeare
As You Like It – by William Shakespeare
Titus Andronicus – by William Shakespeare
Fiddler on the Roof – music by Jerry Bock, lyrics by Sheldon Harnick, book by Joseph Stein
Tartuffe – by Molière
The Diary of Anne Frank – by Frances Goodrich and Albert Hackett
Patience – music by Arthur Sullivan, libretto by W. S. Gilbert
Medea – by Euripides
Elizabeth Rex – by Timothy Findley
The Three Musketeers – by Alexandre Dumas
The Importance of Being Earnest – by Oscar Wilde

2001
The Merchant of Venice – by William Shakespeare
Twelfth Night – by William Shakespeare
The Sound of Music – by Richard Rodgers and Oscar Hammerstein II
Inherit the Wind – by Jerome Lawrence and Robert Edwin Lee
Private Lives – by Noël Coward
Who's Afraid of Virginia Woolf? – by Edward Albee
The Seagull – by Anton Chekhov
Wingfield on Ice – by Dan Needles
Henry V – by William Shakespeare
Henry IV, Part 1 – by William Shakespeare
Henry IV, Part 2 (Falstaff) – by William Shakespeare
Tempest-Tost – by Robertson Davies
The Trials of Ezra Pound – by Timothy Findley
Good Mother – by Damien Atkins

2002
All's Well That Ends Well – by William Shakespeare
My Fair Lady – book and lyrics by Alan Jay Lerner, music by Frederick Loewe
Romeo and Juliet – by William Shakespeare
King Lear – by William Shakespeare
The Threepenny Opera – by Bertolt Brecht and Kurt Weill
The Scarlet Pimpernel – by Baroness Emmuska Orczy
Richard III: Reign of Terror – by William Shakespeare
Henry VI: Revenge in France – by William Shakespeare
Henry VI: Revolt in England – by William Shakespeare
The Two Noble Kinsmen – by William Shakespeare
The Lunatic, the Lover & the Poet – adapted by Brian Bedford
High-Gravel-Blind / Eternal Hydra – by Paul Dunn / Anton Piatigorsky
Bereav'd of Light / The Fellini Radio Plays – by Ian Ross / Federico Fellini, adapted by Damiano Pietropaolo
Walk Right Up / Shadows – by Celia McBride / Timothy Findley
The Swanne: George III (The Death of Cupid) – by Peter Hinton

2003
The Taming of the Shrew – by William Shakespeare
The King and I – by Richard Rodgers and Oscar Hammerstein II
The Adventures of Pericles – by William Shakespeare
Love's Labour's Lost – by William Shakespeare
Gigi – book and lyrics by Alan Jay Lerner, music by Frederick Loewe
The Hunchback of Notre Dame – by Victor Hugo
Present Laughter – by Noël Coward
Antony and Cleopatra – by William Shakespeare
No Exit – by Jean-Paul Sartre
The Birds – by Aristophanes
Troilus and Cressida – by William Shakespeare
Quiet in the Land – by Anne Chislett
Agamemnon – by Aeschylus
Electra – by Jean Giraudoux
The Flies – by Jean-Paul Sartre
The Swanne: Princess Charlotte (The Acts of Venus) – by Peter Hinton

2004
A Midsummer Night's Dream – by William Shakespeare
Guys and Dolls – music and lyrics by Frank Loesser, book by Jo Swerling and Abe Burrows
Macbeth – by William Shakespeare
King Henry VIII (All Is True) – by William Shakespeare
The Count of Monte Cristo – by Alexandre Dumas
Anything Goes – by Cole Porter
Noises Off – by Michael Frayn
Timon of Athens – by William Shakespeare
Cymbeline – by William Shakespeare
King John – by William Shakespeare
The Triumph of Love – by Pierre Carlet de Chamblain de Marivaux
The Swanne: Queen Victoria (The Seduction of Nemesis) – by Peter Hinton
The Elephant Song – by Nicolas Billon
The Human Voice – by Jean Cocteau

2005
The Tempest – by William Shakespeare
Hello, Dolly! – lyrics and music by Jerry Herman, book by Michael Stewart
As You Like It – by William Shakespeare
The Lark – by Jean Anouilh
Cat on a Hot Tin Roof – by Tennessee Williams
Fallen Angels – by Noël Coward
Into the Woods – by Stephen Sondheim and James Lapine
The Brothers Karamazov – by Fyodor Dostoevsky
Wingfield's Inferno – by Dan Needles
Orpheus Descending – by Tennessee Williams
Measure for Measure – by William Shakespeare
The Donnellys: Sticks & Stones – by James Reaney
The Measure of Love – by Nicolas Billon
Ruth Draper on Tour – by Raymond O'Neill
Edward II – by Christopher Marlowe

2006
Coriolanus – by William Shakespeare
Oliver! – by Lionel Bart
Much Ado About Nothing – by William Shakespeare
Twelfth Night – by William Shakespeare
The Glass Menagerie – by Tennessee Williams
London Assurance – by Dion Boucicault
South Pacific – by Richard Rodgers and Oscar Hammerstein II
Don Juan – by Molière
Henry IV, Part 1 – by William Shakespeare
The Duchess of Malfi – by John Webster
Ghosts – by Henrik Ibsen
Harlem Duet – by Djanet Sears
The Blonde, the Brunette and the Vengeful Redhead – by Robert Hewett
Fanny Kemble – by Peter Hinton
The Liar – by Pierre Corneille

2007
King Lear – by William Shakespeare
Oklahoma! – by Richard Rodgers and Oscar Hammerstein II
The Merchant of Venice – by William Shakespeare
An Ideal Husband – by Oscar Wilde
To Kill a Mockingbird – by Harper Lee and Christopher Sergel
My One and Only – book by Peter Stone and Timothy S. Mayer, music and lyrics by George Gershwin and Ira Gershwin
The Comedy of Errors – by William Shakespeare
Othello – by William Shakespeare
Of Mice and Men – by John Steinbeck
A Delicate Balance – by Edward Albee
The Blonde, the Brunette and the Vengeful Redhead – by Robert Hewett
Shakespeare's Will – by Vern Thiessen
The Odyssey – by Derek Walcott
Pentecost – by David Edgar

2008
Hamlet – by William Shakespeare
The Taming of the Shrew – by William Shakespeare
Romeo and Juliet – by William Shakespeare
All's Well That Ends Well – by William Shakespeare
Love's Labour's Lost – by William Shakespeare
The Music Man – by Meredith Willson
Cabaret – book by Joe Masteroff, lyrics by Fred Ebb, music by John Kander
Caesar and Cleopatra – by George Bernard Shaw
Fuente Ovejuna – by Lope de Vega
The Trojan Women – by Euripides
Emilia Galotti – by Gotthold Ephraim Lessing
Palmer Park – by Joanna McClelland Glass
Moby-Dick – by Morris Panych
Krapp's Last Tape / Hughie – by Samuel Beckett / Eugene O'Neill
Her Infinite Variety – by Peter Hinton
There Reigns Love – by Simon Callow

2009
A Midsummer Night's Dream – by William Shakespeare
Macbeth – by William Shakespeare
Julius Caesar – by William Shakespeare
Bartholomew Fair – by Ben Jonson
Cyrano de Bergerac – by Edmond Rostand
Three Sisters – by Anton Chekhov
The Importance of Being Earnest – by Oscar Wilde
Phèdre – by Jean Racine
The Trespassers – by Morris Panych
Zastrozzi – by George F. Walker
Rice Boy – by Sunil Kuruvilla
West Side Story – book by Arthur Laurents, music by Leonard Bernstein, lyrics by Stephen Sondheim
A Funny Thing Happened On The Way To The Forum – music and lyrics by Stephen Sondheim, book by Burt Shevelove and Larry Gelbart

2010
The Tempest – by William Shakespeare
As You Like It – by William Shakespeare
The Winter's Tale – by William Shakespeare
The Two Gentlemen of Verona – by William Shakespeare
Do Not Go Gentle – by Leon Pownall
Kiss Me, Kate – by Cole Porter
Dangerous Liaisons – by Christopher Hampton
Evita – book by Arthur Laurents, music by Andrew Lloyd Webber, lyrics by Tim Rice
Peter Pan – by J.M. Barrie
Jacques Brel is Alive and Well and Living in Paris – by Jacques Brel and Eric Blau
King of Thieves – by George F. Walker
For the Pleasure of Seeing Her Again – by Michel Tremblay

2011
Twelfth Night – by William Shakespeare
The Merry Wives of Windsor – by William Shakespeare
Titus Andronicus – by William Shakespeare
Richard III – by William Shakespeare
Camelot – by Alan Jay Lerner and Frederick Loewe
Jesus Christ Superstar – by Andrew Lloyd Webber and Tim Rice
The Grapes of Wrath – by Frank Galati
The Homecoming – by Harold Pinter
The Misanthrope – by Molière
Hosanna – by Michel Tremblay
The Little Years – by John Mighton
Shakespeare's Will – by Vern Thiessen

2012
Much Ado About Nothing – by William Shakespeare
42nd Street – book by Michael Stewart and Mark Bramble, lyrics by Al Dubin, music by Harry Warren
Henry V – by William Shakespeare
The Matchmaker – by Thornton Wilder
A Word or Two – by Christopher Plummer
The Pirates of Penzance – music by Arthur Sullivan, libretto by W. S. Gilbert
You're a Good Man, Charlie Brown – music and lyrics by Clark Gesner, based on characters created by Charles M. Schulz
Cymbeline – by William Shakespeare
Elektra – by Sophocles
Wonderlust – by Morris Panych, music by Marek Norman
The Hirsch Project – by Alon Nashman and Paul Thompson
The Best Brothers – by Daniel MacIvor
MacHomer – by Rick Miller
The War of 1812 - by Michael Hollingsworth

2013
The 2013 season was staged by Artistic Director Antoni Cimolino around the themes of Societies Divided and The Outsider
Romeo and Juliet – by William Shakespeare
Fiddler on the Roof – music by Jerry Bock, lyrics by Sheldon Harnick, book by Joseph Stein
The Three Musketeers – by Peter Raby, adapted from the novel by Alexandre Dumas
The Merchant of Venice – by William Shakespeare
Blithe Spirit – by Noël Coward
The Who's Tommy - by Pete Townshend and Des McAnuff
Othello – by William Shakespeare
Measure for Measure – by William Shakespeare
Mary Stuart – by Friedrich Schiller
Waiting for Godot – by Samuel Beckett
Taking Shakespeare – by John Murrell
The Thrill – by Judith Thompson

2014
The 2014 season was staged by Artistic Director Antoni Cimolino around the theme of Madness: Minds Pushed to the Edge
 King Lear – by William Shakespeare
Crazy for You – book by Ken Ludwig, lyrics by Ira Gershwin, music by George Gershwin
A Midsummer Night's Dream – by William Shakespeare
The Beaux' Stratagem – by George Farquhar
Hay Fever – by Noël Coward
Man of La Mancha – book by Dale Wasserman, lyrics by Joe Darion, music by Mitch Leigh
Alice Through the Looking-Glass – by Lewis Carroll, adapted by James Reaney
Mother Courage – by Bertolt Brecht
King John – by William Shakespeare
Antony and Cleopatra – by William Shakespeare
Christina, The Girl King – by Michel Marc Bouchard, translated by Linda Gaboriau

2015
The 2015 season was staged by Artistic Director Antoni Cimolino around the theme of Discovery, with a selection of 13 plays that explore "eureka" moments
Hamlet - by William Shakespeare
The Sound of Music  - by Richard Rodgers and Oscar Hammerstein II
The Taming of the Shrew ‚ by William Shakespeare
Love's Labour's Lost - by William Shakespeare
She Stoops to Conquer - by Oliver Goldsmith
Carousel - by Richard Rodgers and Oscar Hammerstein II
The Diary of Anne Frank - by Frances Goodrich and Albert Hackett
Oedipus - by Sophocles
Pericles - by William Shakespeare
The Physicists - by Friedrich Durrenmatt
The Alchemist - by Ben Jonson
Possible Worlds - by John Mighton
The Last Wife - by Kate Hennig

2016
The 2016 season was staged by Artistic Director Antoni Cimolino around the theme of After the Victory
Shakespeare in Love - by Lee Hall, adapted from the screenplay by Tom Stoppard and Marc Norman
Breath of Kings - adapted by Graham Abbey, based on four plays by William Shakespeare
As You Like It – by William Shakespeare
Macbeth – by William Shakespeare
A Chorus Line - music by Marvin Hamlisch, lyrics by Edward Kleban, book by James Kirkwood, Jr. and Nicholas Dante
A Little Night Music - music and lyrics by Stephen Sondheim, book by Hugh Wheeler
Bunny - by Hannah Moscovitch
John Gabriel Borkman - by Henrik Ibsen
The Hypochondriac - by Richard Bean
The Lion, the Witch and the Wardrobe - by C.S. Lewis, adapted by Adrian Mitchell
All My Sons - by Arthur Miller
The Aeneid - adapted by Olivier Kemeid, translated by Maureen Labonté

2017
The 2017 season was staged by Artistic Director Antoni Cimolino around the theme of Questions of Identity
Twelfth Night – by William Shakespeare
Romeo and Juliet – by William Shakespeare
Tartuffe – by Molière
Guys and Dolls – music and lyrics by Frank Loesser, book by Jo Swerling and Abe Burrows
H.M.S. Pinafore – music by Arthur Sullivan, libretto by W. S. Gilbert
Treasure Island – by Robert Louis Stevenson
The School for Scandal – by Richard Brinsley Sheridan
The Komagata Maru Incident – by Sharon Pollock
The Breathing Hole – by Colleen Murphy
The Virgin Trial – by Kate Hennig
Bakkhai – by Euripides
The Changeling – by Thomas Middleton and William Rowley
The Madwoman of Chaillot – by Jean Giraudoux
Timon of Athens – by William Shakespeare

2018
For the 2018 season, Artistic Director Antoni Cimolino has chosen 12 productions that explore the theme of Free Will
The Tempest – by William Shakespeare
The Music Man – by Meredith Willson
Julius Caesar – by William Shakespeare
Coriolanus – by William Shakespeare
Napoli Milionaria – by Eduardo De Filippo, in a new translation by John Murrell, from a literal translation by Donato Santeramo
To Kill a Mockingbird – by Harper Lee, dramatized by Christoper Sergel
The Rocky Horror Show – by Richard O'Brien
An Ideal Husband – by Oscar Wilde
Paradise Lost – by John Milton, adapted for the theatre by Erin Shields
Brontë – by Jordi Mand
The Comedy of Errors – by William Shakespeare
Long Day's Journey Into Night – by Eugene O'Neill

2019
For the 2019 season, Artistic Director Antoni Cimolino has chosen 12 productions that explore the theme of Breaking Boundaries
Othello – by William Shakespeare
Billy Elliot the Musical – Book and Lyrics by Lee Hall, music by Elton John
The Merry Wives of Windsor – by William Shakespeare
Henry VIII – by William Shakespeare
The Crucible – by Arthur Miller
The Neverending Story – by Michael Ende, adapted for the stage by David S. Craig
Little Shop of Horrors – Book and Lyrics by Howard Ashman, music by Alan Menken
Birds of a Kind – by Wajdi Mouawad, English translation by Linda Gaboriau
The Front Page – by Ben Hecht and Charles MacArthur
Nathan the Wise – by Gotthold Ephraim Lessing, in a version by Edward Kemp
Private Lives – by Noël Coward
Mother’s Daughter – by Kate Hennig

2020
The 2020 season had a theme of Power, and was to mark the opening of the new Tom Patterson Theatre Centre.

In March 2020, as preparations for the upcoming season were underway, the Festival was forced to announce performance cancellations and layoffs due to the COVID-19 pandemic. A month later, the entire 2020 season was put on hold and effectively cancelled. Just before the season's cancellation, Cimolino announced that all productions that had been filmed as part of the Stratford Festival On Film series would be streamed online for free, with a different production being shown each week. Throughout the summer of 2020, the Festival produced four web series which, along with all the filmed productions and other Stratford documentaries and interviews, were launched in October 2020 on the new Stratfest@Home web streaming service. Some of the cancelled stage productions were presented in subsequent seasons.

Richard III – by William Shakespeare
All's Well That Ends Well – by William Shakespeare
Here's What It Takes – music and lyrics by Steven Page, book by Daniel MacIvor, additional music and lyrics by Craig Northey
Frankenstein Revived – by Morris Panych, based on the novel by Mary Shelley
An Undiscovered Shakespeare – by Rebecca Northan
Much Ado About Nothing – by William Shakespeare
Chicago – music by John Kander, lyrics by Fred Ebb, and book by Ebb and Bob Fosse
Hamlet – by William Shakespeare
The Miser – by Molière, translated by Ranjit Bolt
Wendy & Peter Pan – by Ella Hickson, from the book by J.M. Barrie
Monty Python's Spamalot – book and lyrics by Eric Idle, music by John Du Prez and Eric Idle
Wolf Hall – by Hilary Mantel, adapted for the stage by Mike Poulton
Three Tall Women – by Edward Albee
The Rez Sisters – by Thomson Highway
Hamlet–911 – by Ann-Marie MacDonald

2021
In April 2021, the Stratford Festival announced a season of plays and cabarets, most of which took place under canopies outside the Festival and Tom Patterson Theatres with reduced cast sizes and social distancing. Only Three Tall Women was presented indoors at the Studio Theatre. The 2021 season theme was metamorphosis.

Plays
Three Tall Women – by Edward Albee
R + J – by William Shakespeare , adapted by Ravi Jain, Christine Horne & Alex Bulmer
A Midsummer Night's Dream – by William Shakespeare
The Rez Sisters – by Thomson Highway
I Am William – by Rébecca Déraspe
Serving Elizabeth – by Marcia Johnson

Cabarets
Why We Tell the Story: A Celebration of Black Musical Theatre – curated and directed by Marcus Nance
You Can't Stop the Beat: The Enduring Power of Musical Theatre – curated and directed by Thom Allison
Play On! A Shakespeare-Inspired Mixtape – curated and directed by Robert Markus, Julia Nish-Lapidus and James Wallis
Freedom: Spirit and Legacy of Black Music – curated and directed by Beau Dixon
Finally There's Sun: A Cabaret of Resilience – curated and directed by Sara Farb and Steve Ross

2022
Hamlet – by William Shakespeare
Chicago – music by John Kander, lyrics by Fred Ebb, and book by Ebb and Bob Fosse
The Miser – by Molière, translated by Ranjit Bolt
Richard III – by William Shakespeare
All's Well That Ends Well – by William Shakespeare
Death and the King's Horseman – by Wole Soyinka
Little Women – by Louisa May Alcott, adapted by Jordi Mand
Every Little Nookie – by Sunny Drake
Hamlet–911 – by Ann-Marie MacDonald
1939 – by Jani Lauzon and Kaitlyn Riordan

2023
King Lear – by William Shakespeare
Rent – Book, Music and Lyrics by Jonathan Larson
Much Ado About Nothing – by William Shakespeare 
Les Belles-Soeurs – by Michel Tremblay 
Monty Python's Spamalot – book and lyrics by Eric Idle, music by John Du Prez and Eric Idle
A Wrinkle in Time – by Madeleine L’Engle, Adapted for the stage by Thomas Morgan Jones
Frankenstein Revived – by Morris Panych, based on the novel by Mary Shelley
Richard II – by William Shakespeare, Adapted by Brad Fraser
Grand Magic – by Eduardo De Filippo, in a new English translation by John Murrell
Wedding Band – by Alice Childress
Casey and Diana – by Nick Green, a Stratford Festival commission
Women of the Fur Trade – by Frances Koncan
Love’s Labour’s Lost – by William Shakespeare

Frequency of production of Shakespeare's plays
Comedies	
The Tempest - 1962, 1976, 1982, 1992, 1999, 2005, 2010, 2018
The Two Gentlemen of Verona - 1975, 1984, 1988, 1992, 1998, 2010
The Merry Wives of Windsor - 1956, 1967, 1978, 1982, 1990, 1995, 2011, 2019
Measure for Measure - 1954, 1969, 1975, 1976, 1985, 1992, 2005, 2013
The Comedy of Errors - 1963, 1975, 1981, 1989, 1994, 1995, 2007, 2018
Much Ado About Nothing - 1959, 1971, 1977, 1980, 1983, 1987, 1991, 1998, 2006, 2012, 2023
Love's Labour's Lost - 1961, 1974, 1979, 1983, 1984, 1989, 1992, 2003, 2008, 2015, 2023
A Midsummer Night's Dream - 1960, 1968, 1976, 1977, 1982, 1984, 1989, 1993, 1999, 2004, 2009, 2014, 2021
The Merchant of Venice - 1955, 1970, 1976, 1984, 1989, 1996, 2001, 2007, 2013
As You Like It - 1959, 1972, 1977, 1978, 1983, 1987, 1990, 1996, 2000, 2005, 2010, 2016
The Taming of the Shrew - 1954, 1962, 1973, 1979, 1981, 1988, 1997, 2003, 2008, 2015
All's Well That Ends Well - 1953, 1977, 1982, 1988, 2002, 2008, 2022
Twelfth Night - 1957, 1966, 1975, 1980, 1985, 1988, 1991, 1994, 2001, 2006, 2011, 2017
The Winter's Tale - 1958, 1978, 1986, 1998, 2010
Pericles, Prince of Tyre - 1973, 1974, 1986, 2003, 2015
The Two Noble Kinsmen - 2002

Histories	
King John - 1960, 1974, 1993, 2004, 2014
Richard II - 1964, 1979, 1983, 1999, 2016, 2023
Henry IV, Part 1 - 1958, 1965, 1979, 1984, 2001, 2006, 2016
Henry IV, Part 2 - 1965, 1979, 2001, 2016
Henry V - 1966, 1980, 1989, 2001, 2012, 2016
Henry VI, Part 1 - 1966, 1980, 2002
Henry VI, Part 2 - 1966, 1980, 2002
Henry VI, Part 3 - 1966, 1980, 2002
Richard III - 1953, 1967, 1977, 1988, 1997, 2002, 2011, 2022 
Henry VIII - 1961, 1986, 2004, 2019

Tragedies	
Troilus and Cressida - 1963, 1987, 2003
Coriolanus - 1961, 1981, 1997, 2006, 2018
Titus Andronicus - 1978, 1980, 1989, 2000, 2011
Romeo and Juliet - 1960, 1968, 1977, 1984, 1987, 1992, 1997, 2002, 2008, 2013, 2017, 2021
Timon of Athens - 1963, 1991, 2004, 2017
Julius Caesar - 1955, 1965, 1978, 1982, 1990, 1998, 2009, 2018
Macbeth - 1962, 1971, 1978, 1983, 1986, 1990, 1995, 1999, 2004, 2009, 2016
Hamlet - 1957, 1969, 1976, 1986, 1991, 1994, 2000, 2008, 2015, 2022
King Lear - 1964, 1971, 1979, 1980, 1985, 1988, 1996, 2002, 2007, 2014, 2023
Othello - 1959, 1973, 1979, 1987, 1994, 2007, 2013, 2019
Antony and Cleopatra - 1967, 1976, 1993, 2003, 2014
Cymbeline - 1970, 1986, 2004, 2012

Note: All 3 parts of Henry VI were performed in 1966 and 1980 in an abridged version. In 2002, using the Barton/Hall method of combining 1 Henry VI with the first half of 2 Henry VI, and the second half of 2 Henry VI with 3 Henry VI, the plays were renamed Henry VI: Revenge in France and Henry VI: Revolt in England. In 2016, "Richard II" and "1 Henry IV" were combined as were "2 Henry IV" and "Henry V". The Plays were renamed "Breath of Kings: Rebellion" and "Breath of Kings: Redemption".

Works by other authors produced three times or more
Alice Through the Looking-Glass - 1994, 1996, 2014
The Cherry Orchard - 1965, 1987, 1998
Cyrano de Bergerac - 1962/1963, 1994, 2009
The Gondoliers - 1962, 1983/1984, 1995
Guys and Dolls - 1990, 2004, 2017
H.M.S. Pinafore - 1960, 1981, 1992, 2017
The Importance of Being Earnest - 1975/1976, 1979, 1993, 2009
Long Day's Journey into Night - 1980, 1994/1995, 2018
The Mikado - 1963, 1982/1983/1984, 1993
The Music Man - 1996, 2008, 2018
Oedipus Rex - 1954/1955, 1988, 1997, 2015
The Pirates of Penzance - 1961/1962, 1985, 1994, 2012
Private Lives - 1978, 2001, 2019
The School for Scandal - 1970, 1987, 1999, 2017
She Stoops to Conquer - 1972/1973, 1985, 2015
Tartuffe - 1968/1969, 1983/1984, 2000, 2017
The Three Musketeers - 1968, 1988, 2000, 2013
Waiting for Godot - 1968, 1984, 1996, 1998, 2013

References

External links
 Stratford Festival Past Productions
 J. Alan B. Somerset. (1991). The Stratford Festival Story, 1st edition. Greenwood Press. 
 Shakespeare in Performance database
 Press release announcing part of 2008 season
 Press release announcing full 2008 season
 Press release announcing additions to 2008 season
 Press release announcing full 2009 season

Canadian theatre company production histories
Theatre festivals in Ontario